The 2013 W-League season is the 19th season of the league's existence, and 10th season of second division women's soccer in the United States. The regular season started on May 11 and ended on July 14.

Changes from 2012 season

Name changes 
Three teams changed their name in the off-season:

Expansion teams 
Two teams were added for the season:

Teams leaving 
Five teams folded or self-relegated following the 2012 season:
New Jersey Rangers - Denville, New Jersey
Northern Virginia Majestics - Manassas, Virginia
Rochester Ravens - Rochester, New York
Vancouver Whitecaps Women - Vancouver, British Columbia
Victoria Highlanders Women - Victoria, British Columbia
One team moved following the 2012 season
D.C. United Women was renamed Washington Spirit and moved to the National Women's Soccer League. The Washington Spirit Reserves team was created, which then joined the W-League.

Standings
As of 7/14/2013

Northeastern Conference

Southeastern Conference

Central Conference

Western Conference

Playoffs
Nine teams qualified for the postseason with one champion advancing from each conference to the 2013 W-League Championship, to be held at the IMG Academy in Bradenton, Florida.

Northeastern Conference Playoff

Southeastern Conference Playoff

Central Conference Playoffs

Western Conference Playoff

W-League Championship

Semi-finals

Third Place Playoff

Championship

Statistical leaders

Top scorers

<small>Source:

Top assists

Source:

|}

Awards
 Most Valuable Player: Shan Jones, (VIR)
 Rookie of the Year: Shan Jones, (VIR)
 Defender of the Year: Blakely Mattern, (CAR)
 Coach of the Year: Cindy Walsh, (LAV)
 Goalkeeper of the Year: Genevieve Richard, (LAV)
 Playoff MVP: Ashley Nick, (PAL)

All-League and All-Conference Teams

Northeastern Conference
F: Jessica Fuccello (NJW), Grace Hawkins (LIR), Shan Jones (VIR) *
M: Esther Anyanwu (VIR), Amber Stobbs (WAS), Alicia Tirelli (NJW)
D: Rachel Breton (NJW), Gabby Charno (LIR),  Meghan Cox (WAS), Jessica Kalonji (VIR)
G: Lauren Vetock (VIR)

Southeastern Conference
F: Emilie Fillion (DDL), Savannah Jordan (ATL) *, Cherie Sayon (ATL)
M: Stacy Bishop (TAM), Leah Fortune (CHR), Amanda Naeher (CHR)
D: McCallie Jones (CHR), Blakely Mattern (CAR) *,  Meghan Scharer (DDL), Ashley Swinehart (CAR)
G: Elizabeth Hull (CAR)

Central Conference
F: Nkemjika Ezurike Nathalie (LAV), Emily Gielnik (OTT), Furtuna Velaj (TOR)
M: Chantelle Campbell (LAV), Catherine Charron-Delage (LAV), Alyscha Mottershead (OTT) *
D: Kathryn Acton (LON) *, Kadeisha Buchanan (TOR), Diamond Simpson (KWU), Shelina Zadorsky (OTT)
G: Genevieve Richard (LAV) *

Western Conference
F: Ana Borges (SCL), Danica Evans (COL), Kristen Hamilton (CRW) *
M: Melissa Busque (SEA) *, Sarah Killion (PAB), Ashley Nick (PAB) *
D: Sasha Andrews (PAB), Rachel Daly (LAS),  Danielle Johnson (BAB) *, Brooke Spence (COR) *
G: Erin McNulty (SEA)

* denotes All-League player

References

USL W-League (1995–2015) seasons
2
W